Harriet van Ettekoven (born 6 January 1961 in Zandvoort, North Holland) is a former international rower from the Netherlands, who won the bronze medal in the Women's Eights at the 1984 Summer Olympics in Los Angeles, California, alongside Marieke van Drogenbroek, Lynda Cornet, Greet Hellemans, Nicolette Hellemans, Martha Laurijsen, Catharina Neelissen, Anne Quist, and Wiljon Vaandrager. She also competed in the 1988 and 1992 Summer Olympics.

References
 Dutch Olympic Committee

1961 births
Living people
People from Zandvoort
Dutch female rowers
Olympic rowers of the Netherlands
Rowers at the 1984 Summer Olympics
Rowers at the 1988 Summer Olympics
Rowers at the 1992 Summer Olympics
Olympic bronze medalists for the Netherlands
Olympic medalists in rowing

Medalists at the 1984 Summer Olympics
Sportspeople from North Holland
21st-century Dutch women
20th-century Dutch women